Talas is a district of Jambyl Region in south-eastern Kazakhstan. The administrative center of the district is the town of Karatau.

Geography
Akkol village and Lake Akkol are located in the district.

References

Districts of Kazakhstan
Jambyl Region